In mathematics, Berger inequality may refer to

 Berger's inequality for Einstein manifolds;
 the Berger–Kazdan comparison theorem.